Alja is a Slovenian female given name. Notable people with this name include:

 Alja Kozorog (born 1996), Slovenian slalom canoeist
 Alja Omladič (born 1983), Slovenian pop singer
 Alja Varagić, Slovenian handball player
 Alja Robinson Crook (1864–1930), American academic
 Alja Vrček (born 1993), Slovenian handball player